HD 4308 b is a low-mass exoplanet orbiting around HD 4308. It is believed to have almost no orbital eccentricity.

See also
 HD 4203 b
 HD 4208 b

References

External links
 

Exoplanets discovered in 2005
Giant planets
Tucana (constellation)
Exoplanets detected by radial velocity
Hot Neptunes

de:HD 4308 b